Marius Guiramand (12 December 1905 – 26 February 1964) was a French racing cyclist. He rode in the 1931 Tour de France.

References

1905 births
1964 deaths
French male cyclists
Place of birth missing